Mendeleyevsk is a town and the administrative center of Mendeleyevsky District in the Republic of Tatarstan, Russia, located on the right bank of Nizhnekamskoye Reservoir,  from the republic's capital of Kazan. As of the 2010 Census, its population was 22,075.

History
It was founded as the selo of Bondyuga in the 18th century. It was granted urban-type settlement status and renamed Bondyuzhsky in 1928. In 1967, it was granted town status and given its present name after Dmitry Mendeleyev, who visited the factory there.

Administrative and municipal status
Within the framework of administrative divisions, Mendeleyevsk serves as the administrative center of Mendeleyevsky District, to which it is directly subordinated. As a municipal division, the town of Mendeleyevsk is incorporated within Mendeleyevsky Municipal District as Mendeleyevsk Urban Settlement.

Economy
As of 1997, industrial enterprises in the town included a chemical plant, a bakery, and a fertilizer factory.

The nearest railway station is Tikhonovo on the Agryz–Akbash line,  to the south.

Demographics

As of 1989, the population was ethnically mostly Tatar (48.5%), Russian (43.6%), Udmurt (2.4%), and Mari (2.1%).

Notable people
Kapiton Ushkov (1813–1868), a serf who became a major chemical industrialist

References

Notes

Sources

Cities and towns in Tatarstan
Populated places on the Kama River
Yelabuzhsky Uyezd